"Level 5 Judgelight" (stylized as "LEVEL5 -judgelight-") is a Japanese single by the pop and trance duo fripSide, which was released by Geneon Universal Entertainment on February 17, 2010. It is used as the second opening theme music for J.C.Staff's anime television series A Certain Scientific Railgun.

Background
"Level 5 Judgelight" is the first single that fripSide was credited as a group for its lyrics. Satoshi Yaginuma coined the title from two words—"judgement" and the "light" emitted by Mikoto Misaka's Railgun ability—that he described as the "light of justice that gathers around Mikoto as a collective of longing, trust, and bond".

Track listing

Limited edition
The single's limited edition is bundled with a DVD and was also released on February 17, 2010.

Chart

References

2010 songs
2010 singles
A Certain Magical Index music
Anime songs
Japanese-language songs